Hartman Louis "Doc" Oberlander (May 12, 1864 – November 14, 1922) was a Major League Baseball pitcher, who pitched in three games for the 1888 Cleveland Blues of the American Association. He played through 1891 in the minor leagues and went to school at Syracuse University.

External links

1864 births
1922 deaths
Major League Baseball pitchers
Cleveland Blues (1887–88) players
Baseball players from Illinois
19th-century baseball players
Syracuse Orangemen baseball players
Syracuse Stars (minor league baseball) players
Oswego Starchboxes players
Scranton Miners players
Toronto Canucks players
Auburn Yankees players
Newark Little Giants players
Sportspeople from Waukegan, Illinois